Antifragile: Things That Gain From Disorder is a book by Nassim Nicholas Taleb published on November 27, 2012, by Random House in the United States and Penguin in the United Kingdom. This book builds upon ideas from his previous works including Fooled by Randomness (2001), The Black Swan (2007–2010), and The Bed of Procrustes (2010–2016), and is the fourth book in the five-volume philosophical treatise on uncertainty titled Incerto. Some of the ideas are expanded in Taleb's fifth book Skin in the Game: Hidden Asymmetries in Daily Life (2018).

Summary 
Taleb introduces the book as follows: "Some things benefit from shocks; they thrive and grow when exposed to volatility, randomness, disorder, and stressors and love adventure, risk, and uncertainty. Yet, in spite of the ubiquity of the phenomenon, there is no word for the exact opposite of fragile. Let us call it antifragile. Antifragility is beyond resilience or robustness. The resilient resists shocks and stays the same; the antifragile gets better".

The phenomenon is well studied in medicine, where for example Wolff's law describes how bones grow stronger due to external load. Hormesis is an example of mild antifragility, where the stressor is a poisonous substance and the antifragile becomes better overall from a small dose of the stressor. This is different from robustness or resilience in that the antifragile system improves with, not withstands, stressors, where the stressors are neither too large nor small. The larger point, according to Taleb, is that depriving systems of vital stressors is not necessarily a good thing and can be downright harmful.

More technically, Taleb defines antifragility as a nonlinear response: "Simply, antifragility is defined as a convex response to a stressor or source of harm (for some range of variation), leading to a positive sensitivity to increase in volatility (or variability, stress, dispersion of outcomes, or uncertainty, what is grouped under the designation "disorder cluster"). Likewise, fragility is defined as a concave sensitivity to stressors, leading to a negative sensitivity to an increase in volatility. The relation between fragility, convexity, and sensitivity to disorder is mathematical, obtained by theorem, not derived from empirical data mining or some historical narrative. It is a priori".

As the book progresses, Taleb covers in depth the domain of the fragile and the opposing domain of the antifragile showing how fragility can be detected, measured, and transformed. Recurring themes throughout the book include the concepts of Skin in the Game, Via Negativa, Lindy Effect, Barbell Strategy, and the Green Lumber Fallacy.

Skin in the game 

To have "skin in the game" is to have incurred risk by being involved in achieving a goal. Taleb extends the definition to include any risk so that "Every captain goes down with every ship". This removes the agency problem or in other words, the "Situation in which the manager of a business is not the true owner, so he follows a strategy that cosmetically seems to be sound, but in a hidden way benefits him and makes him antifragile at the expense (fragility) of the true owners or society. When he is right, he collects large benefits; when he is wrong, others pay the price. Typically, this problem leads to fragility, as it is easy to hide risks. It also affects politicians and academics. A major source of fragility."

Taleb's following book, Skin in the Game: Hidden Asymmetries in Daily Life, furthers the idea, asserting it is necessary for fairness, commercial efficiency, and risk management, as well as necessary to understand the world.

Via negativa 

Via negativa is a type of theological thinking that attempts to describe God by negation or in other words, by what God is not. Taleb expanded this definition to include more generally the focus on what something is not, in action, what to avoid or what not to do. Avoiding the doctor for minor illnesses or removing certain food from one's diet to improve health are examples.

Lindy effect 

Technology, or anything nonperishable, increases in life expectancy with every day of its life. So, a book that has been in for a hundred years in print is likely to stay in print for another hundred years. The opposite is neomania, a love of change for its own sake, a form of philistinism that does not comply with the Lindy effect and that understands fragility. Forecasts the future by adding, not subtracting.

Barbell strategy 

In finance, a barbell strategy is formed when a trader invests in long and short-duration bonds but does not invest in intermediate-duration bonds. This strategy is useful when interest rates are rising; as the short-term maturities are rolled over they receive a higher interest rate, raising the value. Taleb generalizes the phenomenon and applies it to other domains. Essentially it is the transformation of anything from fragile to antifragile.

Green Lumber Fallacy 
The Green Lumber Fallacy refers to a kind of fallacy where one mistakes one important kind of knowledge for another; in other words, "mistaking the source of important or even necessary knowledge, for another less visible from the outside, less tractable one... how many things we call 'relevant knowledge' aren’t so much so". The root of the fallacy is that although people may be focusing on the right things, due to the complexity of the thing, they are not good enough to figure it out intellectually.

The term green lumber refers to a story by authors Jim Paul and Brendan Moynihan in their book What I Learned Losing A Million Dollars, where a trader made a fortune trading lumber he thought was literally "green" rather than fresh cut. "This gets at the idea that a supposed understanding of an investment rationale, a narrative, or a theoretical model is unhelpful in practical trading."

Early occurrences 
An early occurrence of this fallacy is found in the ancient story of Thales. Aristotle explains that Thales reserved presses ahead of the olive harvest at a discount only to rent them out at a high price when demand peaked, following his predictions of a particularly good harvest. Aristotle attributes Thales’ success to his ability to correctly forecast the weather. However, it was not his ability to forecast that made Thales successful but that "Thales put himself in a position to take advantage of his lack of knowledge… that he did not need to understand too much the messages from the stars… that was the very first option on record".

Green Lumber Problem 
The Green Lumber Fallacy only becomes a problem (namely, the Green Lumber Problem) when the perpetuation of the fallacy has a high, and opaque, negative impact. For example:
 Green Lumber Fallacy and a Green Lumber Problem: "James Le Fanu showed how our understanding of the biological processes was coupled with a decline of pharmaceutical discoveries, as if rationalistic theories were blinding and somehow a handicap".
 Green Lumber Fallacy only: "The same holds for the statement lifting weights increases your muscle mass. In the past they used to say that weight lifting caused the 'micro-tearing of muscles', with subsequent healing and increase in size. Today some people discuss hormonal signaling or genetic mechanisms, tomorrow they will discuss something else. But the effect has held forever and will continue to do so."

The Alan Blinder problem 
Toward the end of the book Taleb provides examples of the problems of agency and cherry-picking, calling them the Robert Rubin problem, the Joseph Stiglitz problem, and the Alan Blinder problem. In the last chapter (p. 412), for example, Taleb criticizes Alan Blinder, the former vice chairman of the board of governors of the Federal Reserve System for trying to sell him an investment product at Davos in 2008 which would allow an investor to circumvent the regulations limiting deposit insurance and to benefit from coverage for near unlimited amounts. Taleb commented that the scheme "would allow the super-rich to scam taxpayers by getting free government-sponsored insurance". He also criticized Blinder for using ex-regulators to game the system which they built in the first place and for voicing his opposition to policies of bank insurance that would hurt his business, i.e., claiming that what is good for his business is "for the public good". The event has been discussed in the media, but not denied by Blinder.

Impact 
The concept of antifragility has been applied in physics, risk analysis, molecular biology, transportation planning, engineering, Aerospace (NASA), megaproject management, and computer science.

In computer science, there is a structured proposal for an "Antifragile Software Manifesto", to react to traditional system designs. The major idea is to develop antifragility by design, building a system which improves from environmental inputs.

Critical reception 
Antifragile was a New York Times Bestseller and praised by critics in a litany of notable periodicals including the Harvard Business Review, Fortune magazine, the New Statesman, and The Economist, and Forbes. Although Boyd Tonkin of The Independent criticized Taleb's style as "vulgar, silly, slapdash and infuriating", of the ideas in the book he remarked "time and again I returned to two questions about his core ideas: Is he right, and does it matter? My verdict? Yes, and yes." Michael Shermer gave the book a generally favorable review but Taleb responded in Nature magazine that "Michael Shermer mischaracterizes the concept of ‘antifragility’... The relation of fragility, convexity and sensitivity to disorder is thus mathematical and not derived from empirical data."

Less favorable reviews include Michiko Kakutani of The New York Times, who described the book as being "maddening, bold, repetitious, judgmental, intemperate, erudite, reductive, shrewd, self-indulgent, self-congratulatory, provocative, pompous, penetrating, perspicacious and pretentious." Taleb responded in turn by noting one of five errors from her review and questioning "Is she crazy enough to engage a technical subject without asking for specialist advice, or even engaging in something as basic as Google search?"

Some of the negative reviews focus on Taleb's style and the overall structure of the book, particularly the difficulty to easily summarize on a cursory review. Although the book contains a table of contents, chapter summaries and map, a summary of the book is difficult to discern as the content headers and summaries have no noticeable pattern and many of the titles are abstruse (e.g., Hungry Donkeys) which according to the author is by design intended to handicap book reviewers, forcing them to read the book in its entirety.

See also
 Eustress
 Howlers
 Moral hazard
 Antifragility

References

2012 non-fiction books
Economics books
Philosophy books
Mathematics books
Books by Nassim Nicholas Taleb